Antonio J. Vicens-Gonzalez was the 18th Adjutant General of the Puerto Rico National Guard from January 2, 2009, to December 2012. The Adjutant General is the Commander of the Puerto Rico National Guard. As the Adjutant General he was also the Senior Military Advisor to the Governor of Puerto Rico and oversees both State and Federal Missions of the PR National Guard. He provides effective leadership and management in the implementation of all programs and policies affecting more than 10,500 citizen-soldiers and airmen, and civilian employees of the three components of the PR National Guard: Army National Guard, Air National Guard and Puerto Rico State Guard. MG Vicens holds a B.B.A-Management Degree from the University of Puerto Rico.

Military career
 Vicens was the Distinguished Military Graduate of the Officer Candidate School from the Puerto Rico National Guard class #9 of 1972 at the Joint Maneuver Training Center in Camp Santiago, Salinas PR.
 His military school and courses included Joint Firepower control Course at Nellis Air Force Base, Jungle Warfare Training Course at Fort Sherman in Panama, Command and General Staff Course and Infantry Brigade and Battalion Commander's Course at Fort Benning, and Inter-American Defense College at Fort Lesley J. McNair.
 Vicens' first assignment was from June 1972 to February 1974 where he served as Platoon Leader in Troop E 192nd CAV, PRARNG.
 From March 1974 to May 1974 he attended the Armor School at Fort Knox, Kentucky.
From May 1974 to June 1979 he served as a Platoon Leader in Troop E 192d CAV, PRARNG.
 From July 1979 to December 1979 he served as the Executive Officer of Troop E 192d CAV PRARNG.
 From December 1979 to November 1980 he held the position of S-3 Air in the 165th Infantry Battalion, PRARNG.
 In November 1980 he attended the Joint Firepower School at Eglin Air Force Base, Florida. He then returned to his duties as S-3 Air in the 165th Infantry Battalion, PRARNG and remained there until June 1981.
 From June 1981 to June 1985, he Commanded the Combat Support Company of 1-65th Infantry Battalion, PRARNG.
 From June 1985 to November 1985, he served as the Motor Officer of 1-65th Infantry Battalion, PRARNG.
 From November 1985 to August 1986 he served as the S-2 of 1-65th Infantry Battalion, PRARNG.
 From August 1986 to November 1987 he served as the Assistant S-3 of 92nd Infantry Brigade (Separate), PRARNG.
 From November 1987 to January 1989 he served as the S-2 of the 92nd Infantry Brigade (Separate), PRARNG.
 From January 1989 to December 1989, he attended the Command and General Staff Course at Fort Benning, Georgia.
 From December 1989 to September 1990 he resumed his duties as the S-2 of the 92nd Infantry Brigade, (Separate), PRARNG.
 From September 1990 to March 1994, he served as the Executive Officer of 1-295th Infantry Battalion, PRARNG.
 From March 1994 to November 1994, he commanded 1-65th Infantry Battalion, PRARNG.
 In November 1994, he attended the Infantry School, Fort Benning, Georgia.
 From November 1994 to August 1997, he resumed his duties as commander of 1-65th Infantry Battalion, PRARNG.
 From August 1997 to July 1998 he served as the S-3 of the 92nd Infantry Brigade (Separate), PRARNG.
 From July 1998 to June 1999, he attended the Inter-American Defense College at Fort McNair, Washington, DC.
 From June 1999 to January 2000, he served as the Deputy Commander of the 92nd Infantry Brigade (Separate), PRARNG.
 From February 2000 to March 2004, he served as the Deputy Adjutant General (Army), of the Puerto Rico National Guard.
 From March 2004 to October 2005, served as the commander of the 92nd Infantry Brigade (Separate).
 From October 2005 to January 2009, he served in USAR Control Group (Retired).
 From January 2009 to January 2013 served as the Adjutant General of the Puerto Rico National Guard.

Awards and decorations
Majors awards and decorations are:

  Legion of Merit
  Meritorious Service Medal
  Army Commendation Medal
  Army Achievement Medal
  Army Reserve Components Achievement Medal (with 4 Oak Leave Clusters)
  National Defense Service Medal
  Armed Forces Reserve Medal (with Silver Hourglass Device)
  Army Service Ribbon
  Army Overseas Service Ribbon
  Army Reserve Component Overseas Training Ribbon
  Puerto Rico Service Medal
  Puerto Rico Exemplary Conduct Ribbon
  Puerto Rico Civil Disturbance Ribbon
  Puerto Rico Active Duty for Training Ribbon
  Puerto Rico VIII Pan-American Games Support Ribbon

He has been inducted into the Officer Candidate School Hall of Fame of the Puerto Rico National Guard in Fort Allen, Puerto Rico and The Inter-American Defence College, Ft. McNair, Washington DC.

Effective dates of promotions

See also

List of Puerto Rican military personnel
Puerto Rico Adjutant General

References

1947 births
Living people
People from Santurce, Puerto Rico
Puerto Rican military officers
Puerto Rico Adjutant Generals
Recipients of the Legion of Merit
Recipients of the Meritorious Service Medal (United States)
National Guard (United States) generals
United States Army Command and General Staff College alumni
United States Army generals
Puerto Rico National Guard personnel